Karlin-Stolin is a Hasidic dynasty, originating with Rebbe Aaron ben Jacob of Karlin in present-day Belarus. One of the first centres of Hasidim to be set up in Lithuania, many Lithuanian Hasidic groups are its offshoots.

Today, the Karlin-Stolin dynasty is thriving once again, after being decimated by the Holocaust. Karlin-Stolin Hasidim can be found all over the world: Israel, the United States, Russia, England, Mexico, and Ukraine.

The Karliner Hasidim are especially known for their custom to cry out in a strong and loud voice to God when praying. They are also known for their hospitality.

Karlin-Stolin Hasidim established themselves in Eretz Yisrael in the mid-19th century, settling in Tiberias, Hebron, and Safed. In 1869, they redeemed the site of a former synagogue in Tiberias which had been built in 1786 by Rabbi Menachem Mendel of Vitebsk, but was destroyed in the Galilee earthquake of 1837. Construction of the new synagogue started in 1870, and was made possible by the collection of funds from the Jewish diaspora. This synagogue, still in use today, stands in the cluster of ancient synagogues of Tiberias. It was during this time that Karlin-Stolin Hasidim settled in Jerusalem. By 1874, they had established the Beis Aharon Synagogue of Karlin-Stolin in the old city.

The Karlin-Stoliner Rebbe (sometimes referred to as the "Stoliner Rebbe"), Boruch Meir Yaakov Shochet, resides in Givat Ze'ev, a Jerusalem neighborhood. Most of the Karlin-Stolin Hasidim reside in and near Jerusalem; there are also synagogues in Beitar Illit, Bnei Brak, Kiryat Sefer, Brachfeld, Safed, and Tiberias, as well as in the United States, in Borough Park, Monsey, New York, Los Angeles, California, Lakewood, New Jersey, in London, and in Ukraine as well as Belarus.

The Rebbe's younger brother, Yochanan Shochet, also lives in Jerusalem, and is known as the "Loitzker Rebbe". The Loitzker Rebbe established a Hasidic court, with the permission of his brother, the Karlin-Stoliner Rebbe.

In 2014, the Rebbe's oldest son, Reb Dovid Yehoshua Shochet, moved to Los Angeles, California, and established a shtiebel, Kahal Chasidim Shearis Yaakov, with the blessing of his father. The Rebbe's daughter is married to the son of Rebbe Kalman Menachem Shapira of Piaseczna 
- Ramat Bet Shemesh.
 
A son of the rebbe is married to the daughter of Hagoan Harav o c Lieberman, the Posek of Lakewood. The Rebbe has sixteen children-nine sons and seven daughters, all married. 
In Jerusalem, some of the Karliner Hasidim wear the traditional garb of Jerusalem Haredim on Shabbat, the golden caftan.

Lineage of the Karliner Dynasty
 Rebbe Aaron ben Jacob of Karlin (1736–1772) - founder of the dynasty, a disciple of the Maggid of Mezritch, who was a disciple of the Baal Shem Tov, the founder of Hasidism, author of the Sabbath hymn Kah Ekhsof 
 ( of Karlin (1738–1792) - son of Rabbi Meir HaLevi - disciple of the Maggid and of Rebbe Aaron HaGadol)
 Rebbe Asher Perlow (the first) of Stolin (1760–1826) - son of Rebbe Aaron HaGadol, and disciple of Rebbe Shlomo of Karlin.
 Rebbe Aaron ben Asher of Karlin (the second) Perlow of Karlin (1802–1872) - author of Beis Aharon - son of Rebbe Asher; he was the son-in-law of Rabbi Mordechai of Kremnitz.
 Rebbe Asher (the second) Perlow of Stolin (d. 1873) - son of the Beis Aharon; by his third marriage, he was the son-in-law of Rabbi Elimelech of Grodzhisk.
 Rebbe Yisrael Perlow of Stolin, "The Frankfurter" (because he is buried in Frankfurt) a.k.a. the "Yenuka of Stolin" (1868–1921) - son of Rebbe Asher the second; he was the son-in-law of Rabbi Dovid of Zlatipola.
 Rebbe Moshe Perlow of Stolin (d. 1942) - son of the Yenuka; son-in-law of Rabbi Pinchos of Kantikuziva.
 Rebbe Avrohom Elimelech Perlow of Karlin (was rebbe in Israel, and went back to Europe) (killed 1942) - son of the Yenuka; he was the son-in-law of Rabbi Mordechai Yoseph of Zlatipola.
 Rebbe Yaakov Chaim Perlow of Stolin ("The Detroiter") (d. 1946) - rebbe in New York, and would frequent the Stoliner community in Detroit; buried in Detroit - son of the Yenuka; he was the son-in-law of Rabbi Avrohom Yehoshua Heshel of Chernobyl Tchidonov.
 Rabbi Aaron Perlow of Stolin (d. 1942) - son of the Yenuka; he was the son-in-law of Rabbi Nosson Dovid Rabbinowitz of Partzev.
 Rabbi Asher Perlow of Stolin (d. 1942) - son of the Yenuka.
 Rebbe Yochanan Perlow (1900–1956) of Stolin Loitzk - later the Grand Rebbe of Karlin-Stolin in America - author of the Karliner Prayer Book Siddur Beis Aharon V'Yisrael - youngest son of the Yenuka; he was the son in law of Rabbi Shimon Shloima of Olyka; he was survived by his daughter, Rebbitzen Feiga, who was married to Mr. Ezra Shochet. They were the parents of the present-day Rebbe.
 Rebbe Baruch Meir Yaakov Shochet (born 1955) - grandson of Rebbe Yochanan Perlow - present Karlin-Stolin Rebbe in Givat Ze'ev. Rebbe Baruch Meir Yaakov Shochet is the son-in-law of Rabbi Moshe David Steinwurtzel - Rosh Yeshiva of the Bobover Yeshiva in New York.
 Rebbe Yochanan Shochet - grandson of Rebbe Yochanan - present Loitzker Rebbe in Jerusalem, son-in-law of Rabbi Yisrael Yair Danziger of Aleksander.
Many of the Karlin-Stoliner Rebbe's sons were appointed with highly respected rabbinical positions by their father over many areas:
 Yochanon Shochet - Son-in-law of the present Dzikov-Vhizhniter Rebbe - Rabbi of the Karlin-Stoliner Chassidim in Beitar Illit.
 Yisroel Chaim Shochet - Rabbi of the Karlin-Stoliner Chassidim in Brachfeld.
 Aharon Shochet - Son-in-law of R' Avrohom Pinter from London (Son-in-law of R' Moshe Yaakov Beck ZT"L - Grand Rabbi of Apsha) - Rabbi of the Karlin Stoliner Chassidim in Borough Park.
 Shimon Shlomo Shochet - Son-in-law of Posek of Lakewood Hagoan Harav Lieberman Shlita - Rabbi of the Karlin-Stoliner Chassidim in Monsey, New York, and Lakewood, New Jersey.
 Asher Shochet - Rabbi of the Karlin Stoliner Chassidim in Yerushalayim.

Main books of the Karliner Hasidim
The main Hasidic book of the Karliner Hasidim is Beis Aharon, composed by the Hasidim (followers) of the Rebbe Aharon II of Karlin from his talks. It was very influential on Rabbi Rabbi Kalonymus Kalman Shapira of Piaseczna, who quotes from it frequently in his works. He also analyses the Karliner approach to Hasidism (as opposed to the Habad approach) in his book "Mevo HaShearim".

The current version of the prayer book used by Karliner Hasidim is called Beis Aharon V'Yisrael. It is the second published prayer book ever produced by Karliner Hasidim; the first was published in New York City by the Rebbe Reb Yochanan Perlow of Karlin-Stolin.

See also
 Pinsk-Karlin (Hasidic dynasty)
 Schochet

External links
 Official website of Yeshiva Karlin Stolin
 Hasidim in Pinsk and Karlin - Karlin Hasidism
 Ancient Melodies of the Karlin-Stolin Chassidim
 Website of Kahal Chasidim Shearis Yaakov

 
Hasidic dynasties headquartered in Jerusalem
Hasidic dynasties of Lithuania
Jewish groups in Belarus
Religious organizations established in the 18th century